This is a list of episodes from the London Weekend Television comedy series The Fenn Street Gang, a spin-off of Please Sir!

Episodes 
All of the descriptions are taken from the episode descriptions in the sleeves of the Fenn Street Gang DVDs, released by Network. All of the transmission dates are for the original London Weekend Television transmissions. Alternative transmissions on other ITV regions are not listed.

Series one

Series two

Series three

Fenn Street Gang, The
Fenn Street Gang